Duane Swank (born May 28, 1953, Decatur, IL) is a scholar of comparative political economy and the welfare state. His research has critiqued the conventional view that the welfare state is in decline and has sought to explain the political origins of different types of modifications to capitalism. Swank is currently a Professor of Political Science at Marquette University. He received his B.A. from Millikin University and his Ph.D. at Northwestern University.

References

Swank, Duane, and Cathie Jo Martin. "The Political Origins of Coordinated Capitalism: Business Organization, Party Systems, and the State in the Age of Innocence." American Political Science Review (May 2008).
Duane Swank. 2002. Global Capital, Political Institutions, and Policy Change in Developed Welfare States. New York: Cambridge University Press, Cambridge Studies in Comparative Politics.

External links
Swank's Page at Marquette University: http://www.marquette.edu/polisci/faculty_swank.shtml

American political scientists
Living people
1953 births